Stary Kondal is a rural locality (a selo) in Gromkovskoye Rural Settlement, Rudnyansky District, Volgograd Oblast, Russia. The population was 78 as of 2010. There are 4 streets.

Geography 
Gromki is the nearest rural locality.

References 

Rural localities in Rudnyansky District, Volgograd Oblast